{{Taxobox
| image = 
| image_caption = 
| regnum = Animalia
| phylum = Mollusca
| classis = Gastropoda
| unranked_superfamilia = clade Heterobranchia
clade Euthyneura
clade Nudipleura
clade Nudibranchia
clade Euctenidiacea
clade Doridacea
| superfamilia = Polyceroidea
| familia = Polyceridae
| genus = Thecacera
| species = T. darwini
| binomial = Thecacera darwini| binomial_authority = Pruvot-Fol, 1950
| synonyms = 
}}Thecacera darwini is a species of sea slug, a dorid nudibranch, a marine gastropod mollusc in the family Polyceridae.

Distribution
This species was first described from Chile, South America. It was first collected by Charles Darwin.

Description
This polycerid nudibranch is translucent white in colour, with scattered black spots. The tip of the tail, gills, rhinophores and rhinophore sheaths are yellow.

Ecology
Thecacera darwini feeds on the bryozoan Beania magellanica.

References

Goniodorididae
Gastropods described in 1950
Taxa named by Alice Pruvot-Fol
Endemic fauna of Chile